Udupi Ramachandra Rao (10 March 1932 – 24 July 2017) was an Indian space scientist and former chairman of the Indian Space Research Organisation. He was also the Chairman of the Governing Council of the Physical Research Laboratory at Ahmedabad and Nehru Planetarium at Bengaluru and chancellor of the Indian Institute for Space Science and Technology (IIST) at Thiruvananthapuram. He is known as "The Satellite Man of India". He pioneered India's first satellite launch Aryabhata in 1975. 

Rao was awarded the Padma Bhushan by the Government of India in 1976, and Padma Vibhushan in 2017. He was inducted into the Satellite Hall of Fame, Washington, on 19 March 2013 at a ceremony organised by the Society of Satellite Professionals International. With this he became the first Indian to be inducted. He was also to be inducted in International Astronautics Federation (IAF) on 15 May 2016. He was again the first Indian to achieve such a feat.

Early life 
U. R. Rao was born into a Madhwa Brahmin Hindu family at Adamaru in the state of Karnataka. His parents were Lakshminarayana Acharya and Krishnaveni Amma. He had his primary education at Adamaru. He completed his secondary education from Christian High School, Udupi. He completed his B.Sc. in Government Arts and Science College, Anantpur, M.Sc. from Banaras Hindu University and Ph.D. at Physical Research Laboratory, Ahmedabad under the guidance of Vikram Sarabhai.

Education

Ph.D. – Gujarat University, 1960
M.Sc. – Banaras Hindu University, 1954
B.Sc. – Madras University, 1952

After working as a post doctoral associate at MIT and Assistant Professor at University of Texas at Dallas where he carried out investigations as a prime experimenter on a number of Pioneer and Explorer spacecraft,  Rao returned to India in 1966 as a professor at the Physical Research Laboratory, Ahmedabad.

Career 
Rao started his career as a cosmic ray scientist and worked under Dr. Vikram Sarabhai, which he continued at MIT. In association with the Jet Propulsion Laboratory group, he was the first to establish the continuous nature of the solar wind and its effect on geomagnetism using Mariner 2 observations. Rao's experiments on a number of Pioneer and Explorer spacecraft led to a complete understanding of the solar cosmic-ray phenomena and the electromagnetic state of the interplanetary space. Convinced of the imperative need to use space technology for rapid development, Rao undertook the responsibility for the establishment of satellite technology in India in 1972. Under his guidance, beginning with the first Indian satellite "Aryabhata" in 1975, over 18 satellites including Bhaskara, APPLE, Rohini, INSAT-1 and INSAT-2 series of multipurpose satellites and the IRS-1A and IRS-1B remote sensing satellites were designed, fabricated and launched for providing communication, remote sensing, and meteorological services.

As Chairman of ISRO 

After taking charge as Chairman, Space Commission and Secretary, Department of Space in 1985, Rao accelerated the development of rocket technology  resulting in the successful launch of ASLV rocket in 1992. He was also responsible for the development of the operational PSLV launch vehicle, which successfully launched an 850 kg. satellite into a polar orbit in 1995. Rao initiated the development of the geostationary launch vehicle GSLV and the development of cryogenic technology in 1991. He was responsible for successful launch of INSAT satellites during his stint at ISRO. The launch of INSAT satellites gave a thrust to communications in India, during the 1980s and 1990s. The successful launch of INSAT provided telecommunication links to remote corners of India. During these decades fixed telephone (called as landline) expanded throughout country due to availability of satellite links at different places in the ground. People could talk easily from anywhere by use of STD (Subscriber Trunk Dialing) instead of waiting for hours to get the connection.{{citation
needed|date=April 2013}} This development played a key role in future for India to develop as an Information Technology hub. He was the first Chairman of Antrix Corporation.
He received the Padma Bhushan in 1976.
He was the first Indian Space Scientist to be allowed into the Prestigious “Satellite Hall of Fame” at Washington DC, USA in recent past on March 19, 2013.

Additional responsibilities 

Rao was an elected Fellow of many academies such as Indian Academy of Sciences, Indian National Science Academy,  National Academy of Sciences, Institute of Electronics and Telecommunications Engineers, International Academy of Astronautics and Third World Academy of Sciences.  Rao was conferred Fellowship of the World Academy of Arts & Sciences. He was the General President of the Indian Science Congress Association for 1995-96.  Rao was the Vice President of International Astronautical Federation (IAF) during 1984 to 1992 and continues to be the Chairman of the Committee for Liaison with Developing Countries (CLIODN) since 1986. Rao was elected as the Chairman of  United Nations - Committee On Peaceful Uses of Outer Space (UN-COPUOS) in June 1997 and also Chairman of UNISPACE-III Conference.  He was elected as the Chairman of the 30th International Antarctic Treaty Consultative Committee Meeting at Delhi in April 2007.

He was the Co-Chairman of the National Centre for Antarctic and Ocean Research, Goa. He was the first chairman of Prasar Bharati. Rao was the Fourth President of the Governing Body of the Centre for Space Physics in 2007. While the President, he changed its name to Indian Centre for Space Physics in recognition to its National importance.

Other positions held by Rao in India include :

 Chairman, Karnataka Science and Technology Academy
 Chairman, Bangalore Association of Science Education-JNP
 Chancellor, Babasaheb Bhimrao Ambedkar University, Lucknow 
 Member, Central Board of Directors, Reserve Bank of India
 Additional Director, Bharatiya Reserve Bank Note Mudran Private Ltd., Bangalore
 Chairman, Governing Council of Indian Institute of Tropical Meteorology, Pune

Awards 
He was the recipient of many national and international awards, such as :

National Awards

1975  	Karnataka Rajyotsava Award 
1975   Hari Om Vikram Sarabhai Award 
1975  	Shanti Swarup Bhatnagar Award in the Space science & technology field
1976   Padma Bhushan
1980  	National Design Award 
1980  	Vasvik Research Award in the Electronic Sciences & Technology field 
1983  	Karnataka Rajyotsava Award 
1987   PC Mahalnobis Medal
1993   Om Prakash Bhasin Award in the Energy & Aerospace field
1993  	Meghnad Saha Medal 
1994   P.C. Chandra Puraskar Award 
1994   Electronics Man of the Year Award by ELCINA
1995   Zaheer Hussain Memorial Award 
1995   Aryabhata Award 
1995  	Jawaharhal Nehru Award 
1996   SK Mitra Birth Centenary Gold Medal 
1997   Yudhvir Foundation Award
1997	Rabindranath Tagore Award of Viswa Bharati University
1999  	Gujar Mal Modi Award for Science & Technology
2001	Nadoja Award from Kannada University, Hampi
2001   Life Time Contribution Award in Engineering of INAE
2002	Sir M. Visvesvaraya Memorial Award
2003   Press Bureau of India Award
2004	Star of India Award from Vishwabharathy Foundation, Hyderabad
2004	Special Award 2004, Karnataka Media Academy 
2005   Bharat Ratna Rajiv Gandhi Outstanding Leadership Award
2007	Life Time Achievement Award of Indian Space Research Organisation
2007	Distinguished Scientist Gold Medal of the Karnataka Science & Technology Academy.
2007	Vishwamanava Award by Vishwamanava Samsthe
2007   A.V. Rama Rao Technology Award
2008	Jawaharlal Nehru Birth Centenary Award for 2007-2008 from ISCA  
2017  Padma Vibhushan

International Awards
1973	Group Achievement Award by NASA, USA
1975	Medal of Honour by Academy of Sciences, USSR
1991	Yuri Gagarin Medal of USSR
1992	Allan D Emil Award on International Cooperation
1994	Frank J Malina Award (International Astronautical Federation)
1996	Vikram Sarabhai Medal of COSPAR 
1997	Outstanding Book Award of the International Academy of Astronautics for the Book Space Technology for Sustainable Development
2000	Eduard Dolezal Award of ISPRS
2004   Space News magazine named him as one of the Top 10 International personalities who have made a substantial difference in civil, commerce and military space in the world since 1989
2005   Theodore Von Karman Award which is the highest Award of the  International Academy of Astronautics.
2013   Inducted into Satellite Hall of Fame by Society of Satellite Professionals International' 
2016 Inducted into Hall of Fame by International Astronautical Federation.

Honours 
People's President and distinguished scientist Dr. A. P. J. Abdul Kalam had an effective association with Prof. U. R. Rao. While Dr. A.P. J. Abdul Kalam was President, he presented the Life Time Achievement Award constituted by ISRO and Astronautical Society of India (ASI) to Prof. Rao for his outstanding contribution to the organization.

D. Litt. (Hon. Causa) from Kannada University, Hampi

D.Sc (Hons. Causa) from the Universities of:

1976  	 Mysore
1976 	 Rahuri
1981	 Calcutta
1984  	 Mangalore
1992 University of Bologna (Italy)
1992  	 Banaras 
1992  	 Udaipur
1993 	 Tirupati (SV)
1994  	 Hyderabad (JN)
1994  	 Madras (Anna University)
1994 	 Roorkee University
1995  	 Punjabi University, Patiala
1997 	 Shri Shahu Ji Maharaj University, Kanpur
1999  	 Indian School of Mines, Dhanbad
2001	 D.Litt. (Hons. Causa) from  Kannada University, Hampi
2002	 Ch. Charan Singh University, Meerut
2005	 UP Technical University,  Lucknow
2006	 Viswesvaraiah Technical University, Belgaum 
2007    Indian Institute of Technology - Delhi

Legacy
On March 10, 2021, a Google Doodle was made in honor of his 89th birthday.

Fellowships / Memberships
Fellow of the Indian Academy of Sciences
Fellow of the Indian National Science Academy
Fellow of National Science Academy
Fellow of Third World Academy of Sciences
Fellow of the International Academy of Astronautics
Fellow of Indian National Academy of Engineering
Fellow of the Astronautical Society of India
Hon. Fellow of the Aeronautical Society
Distinguished Fellow Institution of Electronics and Telecommunication Engineers
Hon. Fellow of Indian National Cartographic Association
Fellow of Broadcasting and Engineering Society of India
Hon. Fellow Aero Medical Society of India
Distinguished Fellow of Physical Research Laboratory, Ahmedabad
Fellow of World Academy of Arts & Sciences, USA.
 Fellow of International Aeronautical Federation (IAF) proposed.

Professional Activities in International Arena
1986-1992    Vice President, International Astronautical Federation
1988 to date President, Committee for Liaison with Developing Nations (CLODIN) of IAF
1997-2000    Chairman, UN-COPUOS (United Nations - Committee on Peaceful Uses of Outer Space)
1999         President, UNISPACE-III Conference
2007         Chairman, 30th International Antarctic Treaty Consultative Committee Meeting

Other roles

    President of UNISPACE III Conference, Vienna, in 1979
    Led Indian Delegation in COPUOS and S&T Sub Committee of COPUOS from 1980 to 1994, UNISPACE-II in 1982 and President UNISPACE-III in 2000.
    Chairman of the UN Committee on Peaceful Uses of Outer Space (1996–1999)

Books authored
U. R. Rao, K. Kasturirangan, K. R. Sridhara Murthi. and Surendra Pal (Editors), "Perspectives in Communications", World Scientific (1987). 
U. R. Rao, "Space and Agenda 21 - Caring for Planet Earth", Prism Books Pvt. Ltd., Bangalore (1995).
U. R. Rao, "Space Technology for Sustainable Development", Tata McGraw-Hill Pub., New Delhi (1996)

References

External links
 Interview with Astrotalkuk.org "ISRO the Early Years" August 2013
 Prof. Udupi Ramachandra Rao (1984-1994)

1932 births
2017 deaths
20th-century Indian physicists
Space programme of India
University of Madras alumni
Indian Space Research Organisation people
People from Udupi district
Recipients of the Padma Bhushan in science & engineering
Mangaloreans
Indian space scientists
Tulu people
Scientists from Karnataka
Recipients of the Padma Vibhushan in science & engineering
Fellows of the Indian National Academy of Engineering
Fellows of the Indian Academy of Sciences
Fellows of the Indian National Science Academy
Fellows of The National Academy of Sciences, India
TWAS fellows
Recipients of the Shanti Swarup Bhatnagar Award in Engineering Science